How Are U Bread is a 2020 South Korean-Chinese web drama starring Kim Jun-myeon and Lee Se-young. The drama will be aired in South Korea (via the KT-owned streaming website ) and China simultaneously and is currently in discussion to air in 30 other countries.

Synopsis
A love story between Han Do-woo (Kim Jun-myeon) a genius patisserie, and Noh Mi-rae (Lee Se-young) a variety show writer.

Cast

Main
Kim Jun-myeon as Han Do-woo
A pastry chef, who makes bread that grants people's wishes.
 Lee Se-young as Noh Mi-rae
A script writer for a variety program that infiltrates the bakery in order to cast Ha Do-woo.

Supporting
 Kang Pil-sun as Damon
 Moon Ji-yoon as Patrick
 Han So-young as Do Do-hae
 Sora Jung as President Bang
 Lim Byung-gi 
 Seo Jeong-yeon as Writer Witch
 Lee Ki-chan as Jo Yeon-chul
 Yoon Jin-young as Team Chief Kang
 Ryu Hye-rin as Writer Lee
 Lim Seung-joon
 Lee Soo-ryun as Chae Byung's wife
 Yoo Se-hyung as MC Park
 Kim Dong-hwan as Secretary Oh
 Lee Ryun-kyung as Do Woo-mo
 Seo Jin-won as Hiromura
 Kim In-jung as Shop Lady

Special appearances
 Oh Sang-jin as program host (Ep. 1–5)
 Choi Moon-soon as Gangwon's governor (Ep. 3)
 Joo Eun-jung as Gangwon's state officer (Ep. 3)

Production
Filming began in April 2016 and finished in May 2016.

Original soundtrack

Part 1

Part 2

Part 3

Part 4

Part 5

References

External links
 
 

South Korean drama web series
2020 web series debuts
2020 web series endings
Romantic drama television series